The 2019–20 season was Newcastle United's third season back in the Premier League following their promotion from the 2016–17 EFL Championship and their 25th year in the Premier League. This season Newcastle United participated in the Premier League, the EFL Cup and the FA Cup. The season was scheduled to cover the period of 1 July 2019 to 30 June 2020. However due to the COVID-19 pandemic, the season was temporally suspended from 13 March 2020 until 17 June 2020, and the season finished on 26 July 2020.

Club

Coaching staff
The Newcastle United first team coaching staff for the 2019–20 season consists of the following:

First Team

Squads

First-team squad

Transfers and loans

Transfers in

 Total spending:  £65,000,000

Transfers out

 Total incoming:  ~ £31,700,000

Loans in

Loans out

Pre-season and friendlies

On 24 May 2019, Newcastle United announced four pre-season friendlies including the 2019 Premier League Asia Trophy against Wolverhampton Wanderers, West Ham United, Hibernian and AS Saint-Étienne. On 19 July 2019, Newcastle United announced another pre-season friendly against Preston North End which would take place on 27 July 2019.

Competitions

Overall summary

Overview

Goals
Last updated on 26 July 2020.

References

Newcastle United F.C. seasons
Newcastle United